In mathematics, a proper ideal of a commutative ring is said to be irreducible if it cannot be written as the intersection of two strictly larger ideals.

Examples
 Every prime ideal is irreducible. Let  and  be ideals of a commutative ring , with neither one contained in the other. This proves that a reducible ideal is not prime.
 Every irreducible ideal of a Noetherian ring is a primary ideal, and consequently for Noetherian rings an irreducible decomposition is a primary decomposition.
 Every primary ideal of a principal ideal domain is an irreducible ideal. 
 Every irreducible ideal is primal.

Properties 

An element of an integral domain is prime if and only if the ideal generated by it is a non-zero prime ideal.

An ideal I of a ring R can be irreducible only if the algebraic set it defines is irreducible (that is, any open subset is dense) for the Zariski topology, or equivalently if the closed space of spec R consisting of prime ideals containing I is irreducible for the spectral topology. The converse does not hold; for example the ideal of polynomials in two variables with vanishing terms of first and second order is not irreducible.

If k is an algebraically closed field, choosing the radical of an irreducible ideal of a polynomial ring over k is exactly the same as choosing an embedding of the affine variety of its Nullstelle in the affine space.

See also
 Irreducible module
 Irreducible space
 Laskerian ring

References

Ring theory
Algebraic topology